The 2016 Radio Disney Music Awards were held and filmed on April 30, 2016, at the Microsoft Theater in Los Angeles, California. The ceremony premiered on Sunday, May 1, 2016 at 7/6c on Radio Disney and Disney Channel. Scooter Braun was announced as creative executive-producer this year. This year's show also introduced new categories including Country Music Awards in honor of the newly opened, Radio Disney Country.

Production
Radio Disney DJ Brooke Taylor and American singer Alex Aiono were announced as the red carpet presenters. On  April 28, 2016, Radio Disney and Disney Channel announced that it had partnered with Immersive Media Company, a virtual reality company, to live-stream the red carpet. The  virtual content was viewable on tablets and mobile devices.

Performances

Presenters

Justin Bieber
Laura Marano
Vanessa Marano
Katherine McNamara
Emeraude Toubia
Jacob Whitesides
Cameron Boyce
Maddie & Tae
Fall Out Boy
Forever In Your Mind
Dove Cameron
Jasmine Thompson
Pharrell Williams
Sonika Vaid
Dan + Shay
Alli Simpson
Lennon & Maisy
Marc Cuban
The cast of Black-ish:
Yara Shahidi
Marcus Scribner
Miles Brown
Marsai Martin
Ben Savage
Alessia Cara
Jordan Fisher
Rachel Platten
Erin Andrews
Ashley Benson 
Ashley Tisdale
Skai Jackson
Alyson Stoner
Sabrina Carpenter
Sofia Carson
Daya

Winners and Nominees
The nominees were announced on March 4, 2016. The winners were revealed on April 30, 2016.

References

Radio Disney Music Awards
Radio Disney
Radio Disney
Radio Disney
Radio Disney Music Awards